The Hawthorn Football Club, nicknamed the Hawks, is an Australian rules football club based in Melbourne, Victoria. The club plays in the AFL Women's (AFLW) and VFL Women's (VFLW). The team is associated with the Hawthorn men's team.

History

2021–present: Foundation 
In 2016, The AFL announced the creation of the AFL Women's league with all 18 clubs asked to submit a bid to become one of the inaugural clubs. Hawthorn would be one of five clubs who chose not to submit a bid. In 2017, following a successful debut season the AFL would announce the league would expand from the 2019 season. Unlike 2016, Hawthorn would this time submit a bid to join the league. They would ultimately be unsuccessful.

On 12 August 2021, Hawthorn along with Essendon, Port Adelaide, and Sydney were granted licenses to join the AFL Women's from its seventh season beginning in late 2022/early 2023 season. Bec Goddard who was in charge of the club's VFL Women's side was appointed as Hawthorns inaugural AFLW coach immediately following the announcement.

Season summaries 
List of the last five seasons completed by Hawthorn. For the full season-by-season history, see List of Hawthorn Football Club seasons

Players

Current AFLW squad

Staff

Coaching staff

Club honour board

Achievements

Finishing positions (after finals) 
Note: bold indicates finals appearance

Best and fairest

Coaches

Records 
Bold denotes player still plays for Hawthorn.

Games

 1. Charlotte Baskaran – 10
 2. Catherine Brown – 10
 3. Jess Duffin – 10
 4. Aileen Gilroy – 10
 5. Tilly Lucas-Rodd – 10
 6. Akec Makur Chuot – 10
 7. Tamara Smith – 10
 8. Lucy Wales – 10
 9. Kaitlyn Ashmore – 9
 10. Jasmine Fleming – 9

 11. Sophie Locke – 9
 12. Tegan Cunningham – 8
 13. Tahlia Fellows – 8
 14. Isabelle Porter – 8
 15. Zoe Barbakos – 7
 16. Mackenzie Eardley – 7
 17. Ainslie Kemp – 7
 18. Aine McDonagh – 7
 19. Dominique Carbone – 6
 20. Laura Elliott – 6

 21. Bridie Hipwell – 6
 22. Eliza Shannon – 6
 23. Bridgit Deed – 5
 24. Jenna Richardson – 5
 25. Emily Everist – 4
 26. Sarah Perkins – 4
 27. Kate McCarthy – 3
 28. Louise Stephenson – 3
 29. Tamara Luke – 2
 30. Janet Baird – 1

Goals

 1. Jess Duffin – 7
 2. Tahlia Fellows – 6
 3. Aine McDonagh – 4
 4. Charlotte Baskaran – 3
 5. Aileen Gilroy – 3
 6. Tilly Lucas-Rodd – 3
 7. Zoe Barbakos – 2
 8. Bridie Hipwell – 2
 9. Sophie Locke – 2
 10. Kaitlyn Ashmore – 1

 11. Akec Makur Chuot – 1
 12. Sarah Perkins – 1

References

External links

AFL Women's clubs
Hawthorn Football Club
Australian rules football clubs in Melbourne
Sport in the City of Boroondara
Sport in the City of Frankston